Klimki may refer to the following places:
Klimki, Lublin Voivodeship (east Poland)
Klimki, Masovian Voivodeship (east-central Poland)
Klimki, Podlaskie Voivodeship (north-east Poland)
Klimki, Warmian-Masurian Voivodeship (north Poland)